Dering Building is a historic commercial building located at Morgantown, Monongalia County, West Virginia. It was designed by noted Morgantown architect Elmer F. Jacobs and built in 1896. It is a three-story Romanesque Revival style brick building. It has a rectangular plan, a flat roof, separate store fronts, and recessed portico entrances.  It features a pediment above the flat roof with a rising sun motif and the date of construction inscribed in the center.

It was listed on the National Register of Historic Places in 1994. It is located in the Downtown Morgantown Historic District, listed in 1996.

References

Commercial buildings on the National Register of Historic Places in West Virginia
Romanesque Revival architecture in West Virginia
Commercial buildings completed in 1896
Buildings and structures in Morgantown, West Virginia
National Register of Historic Places in Monongalia County, West Virginia
Individually listed contributing properties to historic districts on the National Register in West Virginia